Restormel is a 1981 fantasy role-playing game adventure published by Judges Guild for any role-playing game.

Contents
Restormel is a universal fantasy supplement.

Publication history
Restormel was written by Scott Fulton, and published by Judges Guild in 1981 as a 32-page book with two large two-color maps.

Reception
Michael Stackpole reviewed Restormel in The Space Gamer No. 50. Stackpole commented that "There is no 'armor class' in Tunnels and Trolls, The Fantasy Trip, RuneQuest, Stormbringer, or most other games. Also, their NPC descriptions omit the attribute Power, which makes the work useless of RuneQuest" and noted that the description as a Universal Fantasy Supplement means "For AD&D but we couldn't get the approval? Billing it as universal is not quite ethical."

References

Judges Guild fantasy role-playing game adventures
Role-playing game supplements introduced in 1981